Kormista is a village and a former municipality in the Serres regional unit, Greece. Since the 2011 local government reform it is part of the municipality Amfipoli, of which it is a municipal unit. Population 1,912 (2011). The seat of the municipality was in Nea Bafra.

References

Populated places in Serres (regional unit)